Graham Edward Arthur Reynolds  (23 September 1937 – 27 February 2008) was a Welsh cricketer who played for Glamorgan from 1969 to 1971.

He was born and died in Newport, Monmouthshire, and was educated at St Julian's High School, Newport, and at Exeter University. He appeared in two first-class matches but was most effective in List A cricket, taking 5 for 37 against Nottinghamshire in the Player's County League in 1969. He captained the Glamorgan Second XI several times. He also played football for several Welsh clubs including Newport County (two spells), Caerleon Amateurs and Brecon Corinthians and was a Welsh Amateur International.

His sporting activities were restricted by his teaching commitments in schools in the Newport area. After Reynolds retired from teaching, he acted as Glamorgan County Cricket Club's school liaison officer in the 1980s and 1990s.

References

External links

1937 births
2008 deaths
Welsh cricketers
Alumni of the University of Exeter
Glamorgan cricketers
Footballers from Newport, Wales
Welsh schoolteachers
Wales amateur international footballers
Association footballers not categorized by position
Welsh footballers
Newport County A.F.C. players
Brecon Corinthians F.C. players